James Anthony Maloney (March 30, 1905 – October 1, 1961) was a Canadian politician who was a Member of Provincial Parliament in Legislative Assembly of Ontario from 1956 to 1961. He represented the riding of Renfrew South for the Ontario Progressive Conservative Party.

Born in Eganville, Ontario, he was the son of Martin James Maloney, who served in the House of Commons of Canada. His maternal grandfather, James Bonfield, was also a politician, having served as a Liberal member of the Ontario Legislature. He was trained as a lawyer at Osgoode Hall. Maloney died in office in 1961 of a heart attack.

Cabinet positions

Family 
James Anthony Maloney has two brothers, Henry Joseph Maloney and Arthur Maloney.

References

External links

1905 births
1961 deaths
Progressive Conservative Party of Ontario MPPs